Abou Touré (born 12 February 1996) is a Senegalese professional footballer, who plays as a right winger for Louletano D.C.

Club career
Touré made his debut for Mafra on January 23, 2016 against Feirense in a 1-1 draw, coming on as a substitute for Luís Carlos.

Career statistics

Club

Notes

References

1996 births
Living people
Senegalese footballers
Senegalese expatriate footballers
C.D. Mafra players
Gil Vicente F.C. players
Real S.C. players
Louletano D.C. players
Liga Portugal 2 players
Association football wingers
Senegalese expatriate sportspeople in Portugal
Expatriate footballers in Portugal